Medical social work is a sub-discipline of social work. Medical social workers typically work in a hospital, outpatient clinic, community health agency, skilled nursing facility, long-term care facility or hospice. They work with patients and their families in need of psychosocial help. Medical social workers assess the psychosocial functioning of patients and families and intervene as necessary. The role of a medical social worker is to "restore balance in an individual’s personal, family and social life, in order to help that person maintain or recover his/her health and strengthen his/her ability to adapt and reintegrate into society." Interventions may include connecting patients and families to necessary resources and support in the community such as preventive care; providing psychotherapy, supportive counseling, or grief counseling; or helping a patient to expand and strengthen their network of social supports. Professionals in this field typically work with other disciplines such as medicine, nursing, physical, occupational, speech and recreational therapy.

History

Britain
Medical social workers in Britain and Ireland were originally known as hospital almoners or "lady almoners" until the profession was officially renamed medical social work in the 1960s. In 1895, Mary Stewart became the first lady almoner in Britain with her appointment to the Royal Free Hospital in London for a three-month trial period.  Lady almoners determined the patient's ability to contribute towards their own medical care at charity hospitals.  Some sources credit Anne Cummins as the "mother of almoners" as she had the ability and the funding to first establish a comprehensive social work service at St Thomas's Hospital in London in 1909.

In 1945, the Institute of Almoners in Britain was formed, which, in 1964, was renamed as the Institute of Medical Social Workers.  The Institute was one of the founder organizations of the British Association of Social Workers, which was formed in 1970. In Britain, medical social workers were transferred from the National Health Service (NHS) into local authority Social Services Departments in 1974, and generally became known as hospital social workers.

China
Medical social work was started in 1921 by Ida Pruitt in Beijing. In-service training was given to social workers for carrying out casework, adoption services and recuperation services.

India
Dr. Clifford Manshardt an American missionary in 1936 started formal training in social work in India through Dorabji Tata Graduate School of Social Work. The first medical social worker was appointed in 1946 in J.J. Hospital, Bombay. In 1960s scope of medical social workers increased in India.

Ireland
In Ireland, the origins of medical social work go back to paediatrician Ella Webb, the first physician in Ireland to appoint almoners to work in her dispensary for sick children that she established in the Adelaide Hospital in Dublin, and to Winifred Alcock, the first almoner appointed by Webb in 1918.

Singapore
Almoners from St Thomas’ Hospital, London, who arrived in Singapore in 1948 and 1949 are recognized as the forerunners of hospital social worker's in Singapore. Medical Social Worker is a Singapore Ministry of Health recognized profession for psychosocial care and a required professional by bylaw in every clinical specialty department.

United States
The Massachusetts General Hospital was the first American hospital to have professional social workers on site, in the early 1900s. Garnet Pelton, Ida Maud Cannon and Dr. Richard Clarke Cabot were the central figures of the hospital social work. Clarke credited his approach as similar to that of Anne Cummins in London. Cannon started specific training for medical social workers in 1912. The major duties carried out by medical social workers were case management, data collection, follow ups, care coordination, health education, financial assessment and discounting patient medical fees.

Further reading

Books
Gehlert, S., & Browne T. A. (Eds.) (2012). Handbook of health social work. John Wiley & Sons, Inc.
Kerson, T. S., & McCoyd, J. L. M. (Eds.) (2010). Social work in health settings: Practice in Context. Routledge.
Jill Barr, & Lesley Dowding (Eds.) (2015). Leadership in Health Care. SAGE Publications.
Harris, M. G. (Ed.) (2006). Managing Health Services: Concepts and Practice. Elsevier.
Daniel B. McLaughlin, &  John R. Olson (Eds.) (2012). Healthcare Operations Management. Health Administration Press.
Curtis, R., & Christian, E. (Eds.) (2012). Integrated care: Applying Theory to Practice. Taylor & Francis.
James F. McKenzie, & Robert R. Pinger (Eds.) (2014). An Introduction to Community & Public Health. Jones & Bartlett Learning.
Elizabeth D. Hutchison (Ed.) (2014). Dimensions of Human Behavior: Person and Environment. SAGE Publications. 
Ann Ehrlich, & Carol L. Schroeder (Eds.) (2013). Medical Terminology for Health Professions. Cengage Learning.
Marianne Neighbors, & Ruth Tannehill-Jones (Eds.) (2015). Human Diseases. Cengage Learning. 
Bohle, P. & Quinlan, M. (Eds.) (2010). Managing Occupational Health & Safety. Palgrave Macmillan.
Michelle A. Green, & Mary Jo Bowie (Eds.) (2011). Essentials of Health Information Management: Principles and Practices. Cengage Learning.

Articles

See also

References

External links

Profession related
   NASW - Medical Social Workers
 Society for Social Work Leadership in Health Care
 Social Work in Health Care

Practice related
 San Diego State University Test Finder
 Institute of Medical Social Workers on record at Warwick University
 U.S. Department of Health and Human Services
 Basic Epidemiology, WHO
 The Health Foundation Resources
 Quality Improvement: Theory and Practice in Healthcare, NHS, UK
 Social Work Psychosocial Assessment - York College

Social work
Health care occupations
Hospice